The Morning After is a 1986 American psychological thriller film directed by Sidney Lumet and starring Jane Fonda, Jeff Bridges, and Raul Julia. It follows a washed-up, alcoholic actress who awakens on Thanksgiving morning beside the dead body of a photographer in his loft, with no memory of the events the night before. She attempts to uncover the truth of what occurred with the help of a former police officer she encounters while on the run.

Released by 20th Century Fox on Christmas Day 1986, the film received generally favorable reviews and was a moderate commercial success, grossing $25.1 million against its $15 million budget. Fonda received a nomination for the Academy Award for Best Actress for her performance in the film.

Plot
Alex Sternberg, a washed-up, alcoholic actress who performs with the stage name "Viveca Van Loren," wakes up on Thanksgiving 1986 next to the bloodied corpse of a sleazy photographer named Bobby Korshack in his Los Angeles loft. Suffering a hangover, Alex does not recall any events from the night before. She phones her husband Joaquin "Jackie" Manero, a salon owner from whom she is separated, and he insists that Alex call the police. Instead, she attempts to flee the city but is unable to get a flight amidst the crush of holiday travelers. In a parking garage, she manages to hitch a ride back downtown from Turner Kendall, a former police officer who was discharged 

Alex returns to Bobby's apartment to clean the evidence and obtain the murder weapon. While leaving, she is met by Turner, returning the pocketbook she left in his car; he claims to have tracked her to the area using a matchbook with Bobby's studio address on it. Alex reluctantly agrees to invite Turner into her apartment, where the two have a makeshift Thanksgiving dinner. The evening ends with Alex drunkenly stumbling into bed, after which Turner leaves. 

In the morning, Alex awakens to find Bobby's dead body in her shower, causing her to flee her apartment. She is met by Turner, who is returning to check on her. Suffering withdrawals, Turner brings Alex to a convenience store to purchase beer, and she confesses to him the events that occurred the day before. Believing Alex killed Bobby, Turner urges her to contact the authorities, but she fears she will not be believed based on a domestic assault conviction in which she stabbed Jackie with a paring knife while intoxicated.

Alex visits her friend Frankie, a drag queen, to obtain clothing to disguise herself. Turner subsequently confronts Alex, informing her that he searched her apartment but found no sign of Bobby's body, and believes that she may have been framed. Meanwhile, police investigating Bobby's murder visit Jackie's salon to question him about Alex's whereabouts. Alex spends the night at Turner's home, and the two have sex. In the morning, Alex is dismayed to find newspaper articles detailing her disappearance and suspicion in Bobby's murder. She visits her lawyer, Mr. Hurley, who is overseeing her divorce case from Jackie. Meanwhile, Turner interviews Bobby's neighbor, who tells him she witnessed Alex raving in a drunken state the night of Bobby's murder. Alex arrives at Jackie's salon, and he agrees to style her hair in attempt to further conceal her identity.

Alex stays at Jackie's salon while he attends a dinner with his new lover, socialite Isabel Harding, and is startled when Turner appears there. Jackie returns with Isabel and renders Turner unconscious by bludgeoning him with a vase. It is revealed that Isabel murdered Bobby, who had been blackmailing her with lascivious photographs, and Jackie framed Alex for the crime to protect her. Jackie attempts to drown Alex in a bathtub to silence her, while a remorseful Isabel looks on. However, police arrive before he can carry out Alex's murder. Isabel turns on Jackie, telling police he is the one who murdered Bobby. Later, Alex visits Turner while he recovers in the hospital, and tells him she has not had a drink in two days. Turner reveals to Alex that he too is a recovering alcoholic.

Cast

Release

Critical response
 the film holds a 63% approval rating on the review aggregator Rotten Tomatoes, based on 19 reviews.

Critic Roger Ebert remarked the film's strong opening sequence, but added: "Unfortunately, The Morning After never lives up to its early promise - not as a thriller, anyway. The plot has some yawning gaps in it, and thriller plots should be watertight. But [it] is worth seeing anyway, because of the characters that it develops, and the performances of Fonda and Jeff Bridges in the two leads." Vincent Canby of The New York Times praised the film's dark humor, writing that it "becomes the kind of enjoyable, sophisticated comedy-mystery that requires much more talent to pull off successfully than is usually acknowledged. It may be instantly disposable, but heaven save us from a season of commercial movies that, like sensible shoes, are designed to last forever."

Accolades
Jane Fonda was nominated for the Academy Award for Best Actress in a Leading Role.

Home media
Warner Bros. Home Entertainment released the film on DVD in 2005, followed by a Warner Archive Collection made-on-demand DVD-R release on June 28, 2016.

References

External links

1986 films
1980s mystery thriller films
20th Century Fox films
American mystery thriller films
American neo-noir films
American psychological thriller films
Films about actors
Films about alcoholism
Films about police officers
Films directed by Sidney Lumet
Films scored by Paul Chihara
Films set in 1985
Films set in Los Angeles
Films shot in Los Angeles
Thanksgiving in films
1980s English-language films
1980s American films